Highland Blade (April 26, 1978 – November 4, 1997) was an American Thoroughbred racehorse who won Grade I stakes on both dirt and turf, taking the Brooklyn, Marlboro Cup Invitational, and Pan American Handicaps. He was owned by Pen-Y-Bryn Farm, a partnership founded in 1971 by brothers William W. and Thomas M. Bancroft, Jr. of Muttontown, New York. They were sons of Edith Woodward Bancroft, who owned Highland Blade's sire, U.S. Racing Hall of Fame inductee Damascus, and their maternal grandfather was William Woodward Sr., who owned the famous Belair Stud.

Trained by David Whiteley, as a three-year-old Highland Blade ran second by a neck to Summing in the Belmont Stakes, the third leg of the Triple Crown series. In winning the 1983 Marlboro Cup Invitational Handicap under jockey Jacinto Vásquez, he defeated U.S. Racing Hall of Fame inductee Slew o' Gold, Kentucky Derby winner Gato Del Sol, and Preakness Stakes winner Deputed Testamony.

At stud
Highland Blade met with good success as a sire. Among his top runners was the multiple stakes winner Highland Penny.

References

 Highland Blade's pedigree and partial racing stats

External links
 Video of the 1983 Marlboro Cup Invitational Handicap

1978 racehorse births
Racehorses bred in Kentucky
Racehorses trained in the United States
American Grade 1 Stakes winners
Thoroughbred family 3-o